Aeby is a Swiss-German surname, derived from the personal name Adalbert (Albert). Notable people with the surname include:

Christoph Theodor Aeby (1835–1885), Swiss anatomist and anthropologist. The "closing plate of Aeby" (sic) is mentioned without a specific citation by the comparative neuroanatomist J.B.Johnston in his 1923 paper on the mammalian amygdaloid region, referring to the locus at the medial hemispheric wall that 'closes' the choroidal fissure. He probably was citing C.T.Aeby.
Georges Aeby (1913–1999), Swiss footballer 
Jack Aeby (born 1923), American engineer
Paul Aeby (1910-?), Swiss footballer
Philipp Aeby (born 1968), Swiss businessman

See also 
Aebi, similar name